The 2012 ITF Women's Circuit – Wenshan is a professional tennis tournament played on hard courts. It is the 2nd edition of the tournament which is part of the 2012 ITF Women's Circuit. It takes place in Wenshan City, China between 9 and 15 April 2012.

WTA entrants

Seeds

 1 Rankings are as of April 2, 2012.

Other entrants
The following players received wildcards into the singles main draw:
  Ran Tian
  Sun Shengnan
  Zhang Shuai

The following players received entry from the qualifying draw:
  Chan Chin-wei
  Han Xinyun
  Liu Fanzhou
  Zhang Yuxuan

The following players received entry from a lucky loser spot:
  Mari Tanaka
  Zhang Kailin

Champions

Singles

 Hsieh Su-wei def.  Zheng Saisai, 6–3, 6–3

Doubles

 Hsieh Shu-ying /  Hsieh Su-wei def.  Liu Wanting /  Xu Yifan, 6–3, 6–2

External links
ITF Search

ITF Women's Circuit - Wenshan